Wellissol (born 24 June 1999) is a Brazilian professional footballer who plays as a forward for Boa Esporte, on loan from São-Joseense.

References

External links

Living people
1999 births
Association football forwards
Brazilian footballers
Rio Branco Sport Club players
Coritiba Foot Ball Club players
Grêmio Esportivo Brasil players
Figueirense FC players
Campeonato Brasileiro Série A players
Campeonato Brasileiro Série B players
Campeonato Brasileiro Série C players
Sportspeople from Salvador, Bahia